Nanoscypha is a genus of fungi in the family Sarcoscyphaceae. There are about 10 species in the genus, which have a widespread distribution.

References

External links
Nanoscypha at Index Fungorum

Sarcoscyphaceae
Pezizales genera